Chinedu Odozor (born 24 December 1977) is a Nigerian long jumper.

Her personal best jump is 6.52 metres, which she first achieved in June 2002 in Lagos.

Achievements 
2006 African Championships - fifth place
2003 All-Africa Games - bronze medal
2002 African Championships - bronze medal
2002 African Championships - bronze medal (100 metres)
1998 African Championships - silver medal

References

External links

1977 births
Living people
Nigerian female long jumpers
African Games bronze medalists for Nigeria
African Games medalists in athletics (track and field)
Athletes (track and field) at the 2003 All-Africa Games